In computational complexity theory, a log space transducer (LST) is a type of Turing machine used for log-space reductions.

A log space transducer, has three tapes:
 A read-only input tape.
 A read/write work tape (bounded to at most  symbols).
 A write-only, write-once output tape.

 will be designed to compute a log-space computable function  (where  is the alphabet of both the input and output tapes).

A language  is said to be log-space reducible to a language  if there exists a log-space computable function  that will convert an input from problem  into an input to problem  in such a way that .

This seems like a rather convoluted idea, but it has two useful properties that are desirable for a reduction:
 The property of transitivity holds. (A reduces to B and B reduces to C implies A reduces to C).
 If A reduces to B, and B is in L, then we know A is in L.

Transitivity holds because it is possible to feed the output tape of one reducer (A→B) to another (B→C). At first glance, this seems incorrect because the A→C reducer needs to store the output tape from the A→B reducer onto the work tape in order to feed it into the B→C reducer, but this is not true. Each time the B→C reducer needs to access its input tape, the A→C reducer can re-run the A→B reducer, and so the output of the A→B reducer never needs to be stored entirely at once.

References
Szepietowski, Andrzej (1994), Turing Machines with Sublogarithmic Space , Springer Press, . Retrieved on 2008-12-03.
Sipser, Michael (2012), Introduction to the Theory of Computation, Cengage Learning, .

Computational complexity theory
Turing machine